Mokhtar Haouari (born 1970 in Oran), an Algerian-Canadian, was sentenced to 24 year imprisonment following the Millennium Plot, after investigators traced one of Ahmed Ressam's credit cards to Haouari. He also provided Ressam with a fake Quebec drivers license.

References

External links
Articles about Mokhtar Houari
Mokhtar Haouari (down) 

Living people
1970 births
Algerian emigrants to Canada
People from Oran
Canadian Islamists
Islamic terrorism in Canada
People convicted on terrorism charges
2000 millennium attack plots